Patmon is a surname. Notable people with the surname include:

Bill Patmon (born 1946), American politician
DeWayne Patmon (born 1979), American football player
Dezmon Patmon (born 1998), American football player, nephew of DeWayne
Tyler Patmon (born 1991), American football player